Hero, Hero is a compilation album of early Judas Priest recordings, released in between British Steel (1980) and Point of Entry (1981) by Gull Records.
It consists of all ten tracks from the Rocka Rolla album, six tracks from the Sad Wings of Destiny album, and an alternate version of "Diamonds And Rust".  The tracks from Rocka Rolla and "Diamonds And Rust" were remixed by Rodger Bain in 1981.  The tracks from Sad Wings of Destiny were not remixed.

Hero, Hero was released under the Gull Records - the band's former record label - in an effort to "capitalize on Judas Priest's popularity." Judas Priest's management firmly states that people should not buy these compilations, because even though it would seem like a new album on the surface, it's just a re-issue of material already recorded. Despite this, the remixed songs on the album appeal to collectors.

The CD releases of the album have produced a few alternate versions.  Some European CDs sequenced the tracks differently so that the tracks from sides 3 and 4 of the LP come before the tracks from sides 1 and 2.  The US CDs released by Transluxe and Koch Records used the mixes from the original Rocka Rolla album rather than the remixed tracks from the original Hero, Hero LP.

Track listing

Personnel
Rob Halford - lead vocals, harmonica
K.K. Downing - guitar
Glenn Tipton - guitar, keyboards, backing vocals
Ian Hill - bass
John Hinch - drums
Alan Moore - drums

References

Judas Priest compilation albums
1981 compilation albums